Dynamic Data Driven Applications Systems (DDDAS) is a new paradigm whereby the computation and instrumentation aspects of an application system are dynamically integrated in a feed-back control loop, in the sense that instrumentation data can be dynamically incorporated into the executing model of the application, and in reverse the executing model can control the instrumentation.  Such approaches have been shown that can enable more accurate and faster modeling and analysis of the characteristics and behaviors of a system and can exploit data in intelligent ways to convert them to new capabilities, including decision support systems with the accuracy of full scale modeling, efficient data collection, management, and data mining. The DDDAS concept - and the term - was proposed by Frederica Darema for the National Science Foundation (NSF) workshop in March 2000.

There are several affiliated annual meetings and conferences, including:

 DDDAS workshop at ICCS (since 2003)
DyDESS conference and workshop at MIT organized by Sai Ravela and Adrian Sandu
 DDDAS special session at the ACC organized by Puneet Singla and Dennis Bernstein and Sai Ravela
 DDDAS Special Session Information Fusion

References 
F. Darema, “Dynamic Data Driven Applications Systems: A New Paradigm for Application Simulations and Measurements. Computational Science.” Int’l Conf. on Computational Science (ICCS), LNCS, 3038, 662–669, 2004.
F. Darema, “Grid Computing and Beyond: The Context of Dynamic Data Driven Applications Systems,” Proceedings IEEE, 93(3), p. 692-697, 2005.
G. Allen, “Building a Dynamic Data Driven Application System for Hurricane Forecasting,” Int’l Conf. on Computational Science (ICCS), LNCS, vol. 4487, p. 1034–1041. Springer, Heidelberg, 2007.
M. Denham, A. Cortes, T. Margalef, E. Luque, “Applying a Dynamic Data Driven Genetic Algorithm to Improve Forest Fire Spread Prediction,”  M. Bubak et al. (Eds.): ICCS 2008, LNCS 5103, pp. 36–45, 2008.
E. Blasch, Y. Al-Nashif, and S. Hariri, “Static versus Dynamic Data Information Fusion analysis using DDDAS for Cyber Trust,” Procedia Computer Science, Vol. 29, pp. 1299-1313, 2014.
X. Shi, H. Damgacioglu,  N. Celik, “A Dynamic Data Driven Approach for Operation Planning of Microgrids,” Procedia Computer Science, 2015.
E. Blasch, S. Ravela, A. Aved, Handbook on Dynamic Data Driven Applications Systems, Springer, 2018.

External links 
1DDDAS.org Has a list of active projects and slides from the current DDDAS program and past contributions from NSF.
CAOS Cooperative Autonomous Observing Systems for Mapping and Monitoring the Atmosphere @ MIT, jointly between EAPS and Aero-Astro
FireGrid FireGrid is a previous example for Emergency Systems.

See also 
Data assimilation
Control systems
Uncertainty Quantification
Theoretical computer science